In the Battle of Melitene in 1100, a Crusader force led by Bohemond I of Antioch was defeated in Melitene in eastern Anatolia by Danishmend Turks commanded by Gazi Gümüshtigin.

After acquiring the Principality of Antioch in 1098, Bohemond allied himself with the Armenians of Cilicia.  When Gabriel of Melitene and his Armenian garrison came under attack from the Danishmend state to their north, Bohemond marched to their relief with a Frankish force.

Malik Ghazi's Danishmends ambushed the expedition and "most of the Crusaders were killed." Bohemond was captured along with Richard of Salerno. Among the dead were the Armenian bishops of Marash and Antioch. Bohemond was held for ransom until 1103, and his rescue became the object of one column of the ill-fated Crusade of 1101.

This battle ended the string of victories enjoyed by the participants of the First Crusade. Baldwin, Count of Edessa and later king of Jerusalem, successfully relieved Melitene afterward. However, while the Crusaders were negotiating the ransom of Bohemond, the Danishmends seized the town in 1103 and executed Gabriel of Melitene.

References
 Eggenberger, David. An Encyclopedia of Battles. New York: Dover Publications, 1985.

Footnotes

Melitene
Battles involving the Seljuk Turks in Anatolia
Conflicts in 1100
1100 in Asia
12th century in the Seljuk Empire
1100s in the Kingdom of Jerusalem